Pine River is a city in Cass County, Minnesota, United States. The population was 944 at the 2010 census. It is part of the Brainerd Micropolitan Statistical Area.

History
Pine River was incorporated in 1901. Its post office began in 1877.

Geography

Minnesota State Highways 84 and 371 are two of the main routes in the community. Although, there are many county roads interconnecting Pine River to the surrounding communities.  Pine River is located 30 miles north-northwest of Brainerd along Highway 371.

Demographics

2010 census
As of the census of 2010, there were 944 people, 417 households, and 199 families living in the city. The racial makeup of the city was 96.5% White, 0.1% African American, 1.2% Native American, 0.4% Asian, 0.1% from other races, and 1.7% from two or more races. Hispanic or Latino of any race were 1.5% of the population.

There were 417 households, of which 29.3% had children under the age of 18 living with them, 27.8% were married couples living together, 14.6% had a female householder with no husband present, 5.3% had a male householder with no wife present, and 52.3% were non-families. 47.7% of all households were made up of individuals, and 27.6% had someone living alone who was 65 years of age or older. The average household size was 2.06 and the average family size was 2.87.

The median age in the city was 43.7 years. 23.9% of residents were under the age of 18; 6.3% were between the ages of 18 and 24; 20.7% were from 25 to 44; 21.6% were from 45 to 64; and 27.3% were 65 years of age or older. The gender makeup of the city was 44.1% male and 55.9% female.

2000 census
As of the census of 2000, there were 928 people, 438 households, and 216 families living in the city. The racial makeup of the city was 96.77% White, 0.75% African American, 1.08% Native American, 0.22% Asian, 0.22% from other races, and 0.97% from two or more races. Hispanic or Latino of any race were 0.75% of the population.

There were 438 households, out of which 25.8% had children under the age of 18 living with them, 37.4% were married couples living together, 9.8% had a female householder with no husband present, and 50.5% were non-families. 48.9% of all households were made up of individuals, and 35.6% had someone living alone who was 65 years of age or older.  The average household size was 2.06 and the average family size was 3.03.

In the city, the population was spread out, with 25.9% under the age of 18, 5.5% from 18 to 24, 21.7% from 25 to 44, 17.7% from 45 to 64, and 29.3% who were 65 years of age or older.  The median age was 43 years. For every 100 females, there were 78.5 males.  For every 100 females age 18 and over, there were 71.1 males.

The median income for a household in the city was $23,480, and the median income for a family was $36,250. Males had a median income of $25,714 versus $19,464 for females. The per capita income for the city was $14,571.  About 10.1% of families and 16.7% of the population were below the poverty line, including 20.7% of those under age 18 and 22.1% of those age 65 or over.

Media

FM radio

92.5 KXKK Country
94.5 KDLB Adult Contemporary
97.5  KDKK Adult Standards
101.9 KQKK Adult Contemporary
102.5 KKWB-FM Country
100.1 KLKS Talk
104.3 WZFJ Christian

AM radio

820  WBKK (under construction)
870  KPRM Classic Country News/Talk
1210 New AM  (FCC application)
1070 KSKK Country
1570 KAKK Oldies

Notable person
 Terry Baker - professional football player

References

External links
Pine River Home Page

Cities in Cass County, Minnesota
Cities in Minnesota
Brainerd, Minnesota micropolitan area